Ivan Ivanov (born 10 June 1956) is a Bulgarian archer. He competed in the men's individual event at the 1992 Summer Olympics.

References

External links
 

1956 births
Living people
Bulgarian male archers
Olympic archers of Bulgaria
Archers at the 1992 Summer Olympics
Place of birth missing (living people)